"Bruxelles je t'aime" is a song by Belgian singer-songwriter Angèle. It was released on October 10, 2021 as the lead single from her second studio album Nonante-Cinq. Angèle wrote the song and produced it with Tristan Salvati. It reached number one in Wallonia.

Background
In a press release, Angèle stated the meaning behind the song:

Content
In a press release, Angèle mentioned that while she lives in Paris most of the time, she is still "attached to her hometown where all her family and childhood friends live". Focus on Belgium wrote that the song is "set against the background of a message of political appeasement between the north and the south" and "describes all the love she has for her city".

Critical reception
Zangba Thomson of Bongmines Entertainment commented that "Bruxelles je t'aime" has "a relatable narrative, ear-pleasing French vocals, and tuneful melodies. The likable dance-friendly tune possesses lush instrumentation flavored with an awesome French pop vibration".

Music video
An accompanying music video was released on 21 October 2021 and depicts Angèle dancing and celebrating on a train from Paris to her birthplace, Brussels.

It was nominated for the UK Music Video Awards for Best Production Design in a Video in 2022.

Charts

Weekly charts

Year-end charts

Certifications

Release history

References

2021 singles
2021 songs
Angèle (singer) songs
Ultratop 50 Singles (Wallonia) number-one singles
French songs